The Federation of Green Lists or Green List (Lista Verde, LV) was a green political party in Italy. Its members included Gianni Francesco Mattioli, Lino De Benetti, Gianfranco Amendola, Alexander Langer, Enrico Falqui, Sauro Turroni and Alfonso Pecoraro Scanio. The Green Lists used the Smiling Sun symbol of the anti-nuclear movement, which was inherited by its successor party, the Federation of the Greens.

History
It was founded on 16 November 1986. The party was formed as a national organisation of Green Lists which had first contested regional elections in 1985, initially being joined by seventy local lists. In the 1987 general election, the Green Lists received 2.5% for the Chamber, returning thirteen deputies as well as two senators in the Senate.

The party took part in the 1989 European Parliamentary elections, receiving 3.8% of the vote, electing 3 MEPs. A rival ecologist list, the Rainbow Greens, received 2.4% in the same election.

In December 1990 the party merged with the Rainbow Greens to form the Federation of the Greens.

Election results

Chamber of Deputies

Senate

European Parliament

Leadership
Spokesman:
Gianni Francesco Mattioli (1986–1989)
Sauro Turroni (1989–1991)

References

Defunct political parties in Italy
Green political parties in Italy
Political parties established in 1986
Political parties disestablished in 1990
1986 establishments in Italy
1990 disestablishments in Italy
Defunct green political parties